Kenton Park is a public park in north Portland, Oregon's Kenton neighborhood, in the United States. The  park was acquired in 1941. A new playground opened in 2018.

See also
 List of parks in Portland, Oregon

References

External links
 

1941 establishments in Oregon
Kenton, Portland, Oregon
Parks in Portland, Oregon
Protected areas established in 1941